The 2015 Pan American Women's Handball Championship was the 13th edition of the Pan American Women's Handball Championship, held in Cuba from 21 to 28 May 2015. It acted as the American qualifying tournament for the 2015 World Women's Handball Championship.

Preliminary round
The draw was held on 25 April 2015.

All times are local (UTC−4).

Group A

Group B

Knockout stage

Bracket

5–8th place bracket

9–12th place bracket

All times are local (UTC−4).

9–12th place semifinals

5–8th place semifinals

Semifinals

Eleventh place game

Ninth place game

Seventh place game

Fifth place game

Third place game

Final

Final ranking

Uruguay, Greenland, and Paraguay all declined participation in the "Final qualification tournament" allowing Mexico the opportunity.

Awards
All-star team
Goalkeeper:  Jéssica Oliveira
Right Wing:  Gleinys Reyes
Right Back:  Nathalys Ceballos
Playmaker:  Eyatne Rizo
Left Back:  Jaqueline Anastácio
Left Wing:  Samira Rocha
Pivot:  Antonela Mena

References

External links
Official website
Results at todor66

2015 Women
Pan American Women's Handball Championship
Pan American Women's Handball Championship
American Women's Handball Championship
2015 American Women's Handball Championship
Handball competitions in Cuba
Pan American Women's Handball Championship